Bamba Dhura is a Himalayan mountain peak situated in the Pithoragarh district of Uttarakhand, India. Kalabaland Dhura (6,105 m) is situated to the west of this peak and Chiring We (6,559 m) is on the same massif. Bamba Dhura massif is the part of divide between Kalabaland and Lassar valley. This peak was first climbed to the summit in 1977 from south by col between Bamba Dhura and Chiring We. The peak has since been climbed through the southeastern and western ridges between the two peaks.

References

Tourist attractions in Uttarakhand
Mountains of Uttarakhand
Geography of Pithoragarh district